Julius Harvey "Ju" Johnston (August 2, 1905 – December 15, 1980) was an American football and basketball player and coach. He served as the head football coach at Cameron Junior College—now known as Cameron University—in Lawton, Oklahoma from 1934 to 1938. Johnston was the head football and men's basketball coach at New Mexico College of Agriculture and Mechanic Arts—now known as New Mexico State University—from 1940 to 1942.

Head coaching record

College football

References

External links
 

1905 births
1980 deaths
Cameron Aggies football coaches
New Mexico State Aggies football coaches
New Mexico State Aggies men's basketball coaches